Two Crude, released in Asia as  is a 1990 beat 'em up arcade game developed and published by Data East. It was a follow-up to Bad Dudes Vs. DragonNinja (1988). The game was later ported to the Mega Drive/Genesis in 1992. Outside Japan, the port was released under the name Two Crude Dudes.

In the game, players control one of two mercenaries hired by the American government to stop the terrorist organization "Big Valley". Their objective is to retake control of a ruined New York City from Big Valley after a nuclear explosion the group caused.

Gameplay
Players control the characters by jumping, dodging and attacking their way through legions of enemies. Because the main characters are muscle-bound brawlers, they have the ability to pick up objects well beyond their own weight (e.g. cars and traffic lights) to use as weapons. They can do the same to most enemies as well. While playing co-op, it is also possible for one player to pick up the other to use as a projectile.

Each player has a life bar, which decreases each time they are hit. Some enemies can grab onto the players and drain their life. A player loses a life when his life bar reaches zero. If the hit that finishes a player is an explosion or flame, he slumps to the ground burnt. The life bar can be fully refilled between stages, with a cut scene showing the player(s) punching a "Power Cola" vending machine causing sodas to fall out which they drink, those vending machines also featured in most stages as replenishment points.

Ports and related releases

The game was later ported to the Mega Drive/Genesis by ISCO/Opera House, but the North American and European versions of them were retitled Two Crude Dudes. The Japanese version of this port kept the Japanese arcade version's title unchanged.

The arcade version was later included in the compilation disc Data East Arcade Classics, along with other Data East arcade games bought by G-Mode after Data East's bankruptcy.

Reception

In Japan, Game Machine listed Crude Buster on their April 15, 1990 issue as being the seventh most-successful table arcade unit of the month. In Hong Kong, it was the top-grossing conversion kit on the Bondeal arcade charts from March to April 1990.

The arcade game was critically acclaimed upon release. Writing for Computer and Video Games magazine, Julian Rignall called Crude Buster "one of the best beat'em ups I've seen in years" and rated it a 95%. Mark Caswell of Crash magazine called it a fun and humorous beat-'em-up. Sinclair User also noted the game's humor, comparing it to playing an interactive cartoon. They wrote that it was even better than other recent Data East games, including the game's predecessor, Bad Dudes Vs. DragonNinja. The magazine dubbed it a "classic" in terms of style and gameplay.

The Mega Drive version was also well-received. Mega magazine placed the game at #37 in their Top Mega Drive Games of All Time. MegaTech magazine said it was "the first Megadrive beat 'em up that comes close to rivalling Streets of Rage".

Notes

References

External links 
 
 
 Crude Buster at arcade-history

1990 video games
Arcade video games
Beat 'em ups
Cooperative video games
Data East video games
Sega Genesis games
Video games developed in Japan
Video games set in 2030
Video games set in the 21st century
Video games set in New York City
Post-apocalyptic video games
Multiplayer and single-player video games
Side-scrolling beat 'em ups
Data East arcade games